Darkside is a 2013 philosophical comedy radio drama written by Tom Stoppard, produced and directed by James Robinson and based on the themes of Pink Floyd's 1973 progressive rock album The Dark Side of the Moon.

Cast
 Amaka Okafor as Emily McCoy
 Iwan Rheon as The Boy
 Bill Nighy as Doctor Antrobus / The Witch Finder
 Rufus Sewell as Mr Baggott / Ethics Man
 Adrian Scarborough as Fat Man
 Peter Marinker as The Wise One
 Robert Blythe as Banker
 Ben Crowe as Politician
 Philippa Stanton as Emily's Mother

Production
Stoppard was first approached with the idea of writing a play based on the album in 1973, but had "no idea" how to approach it until much later. BBC's radio drama producer James Robinson said that the initial idea was "to see what sort of a journey the album takes Tom Stoppard on." Stoppard used all of the album, apart from lyrics, as "a kind of underscore", taking emotional cues from the music. He contacted Pink Floyd's David Gilmour, who gave Stoppard permission to write dialogue that would be heard over the instrumental pieces, and found the resulting script "fascinating". On adapting the album, Stoppard stated: "I didn't try to make a story that was the album writ large in any way. I invented a little story in the spirit of the album, taking a cue as to what level of reality this story might be on."

Themes 
The following philosophical themes are present in the play:
 The trolley problem, a traditional thought experiment
 The tragedy of the commons
 Utilitarianism 
 Utilitarian consequentialism
 Nietzscheanism
 Nietzschean egoism
 Kantianism
 Hobbesianism
 The prisoner's dilemma, a traditional example analyzed in game theory

Marketing
Aardman Animations created a three-minute short film to promote the play, consisting of a montage depicting a world on the verge of collapse, with huge ploughs destroying landscapes and skies filled with warplanes. The short was directed by Darren Dubicki, and was intended to evoke themes of "greed, conflict and consumption" with the eventual message that "Life is futile, and destined to descend into madness." The animators drew inspiration from the surreal album artwork by Storm Thorgerson and Hipgnosis.

Broadcast
The play was broadcast on BBC Radio 2 on 26 August 2013, the year of the album's 40th anniversary. It was preceded by a number of programmes to complement the event. During the  broadcast, Aardman Animations' short film was played in a loop on the BBC Radio 2 website, BBC Big Screens and several third-party sites.
The first online review of the play was by Robin Hilton.
The play is now available on Deezer and Spotify.

References

2013 radio dramas
Plays based on music
Plays by Tom Stoppard
British radio dramas
Fantasy radio programs